Tasley is a census-designated place (CDP) in Accomack County, Virginia, United States. It was first listed as a CDP in 2010. Per the 2020 census, the population was 222.

History 
Tasley, once known as Accomac Station, traces its roots to the coming of the railroad to the Eastern Shore in 1884.  When the station at Tasley was completed rail service began in earnest. The postal service set up a post office at Tasley in 1884.  At one time, Tasley was a bustling railroad town, boasting the first electric power plant, first paved road and first self-organized volunteer fire company in the county.  The Shore's main highway, US 13, ran right through the middle of town. Steamships from Baltimore docked at nearby Onancock; the produce and goods were carried from there to Tasley's busy rail station for fast shipment. In its heyday, Tasley boasted three restaurants, four general stores, a hotel, post office, rail station, two tractor dealerships, two sawmills, volunteer fire company, ice plant, coal sales, car dealerships, several produce grading sheds and power plant.

When the railroad ceased passenger service in 1958, the town was dealt a blow, but the coming of the Route 13 bypass in the mid-1960s robbed Tasley of its commercial and industrial status. The town fell into a deep slumber for many years before the growth in neighboring communities spilled over into its boundaries.  Today, Tasley is home to A&N Electric Cooperative, which provides electric power for the entire Eastern Shore of Virginia; the Foodbank of the Eastern Shore is headquartered there and Studebaker's Antiques sells top-of-the-line vintage advertising items worldwide. A new fire station has been built, and several formerly empty buildings have been purchased and repurposed.

Geography
It lies at an elevation of 39 feet.

Demographics

2020 census

Note: the US Census treats Hispanic/Latino as an ethnic category. This table excludes Latinos from the racial categories and assigns them to a separate category. Hispanics/Latinos can be of any race.

References

External links 
 Town website

Census-designated places in Accomack County, Virginia
Census-designated places in Virginia